The first presidency of Rafael Caldera took place from 1969 to 1974. He was elected by only 33,000 votes.  He was sworn in as president in March 1969—the first time in the country's 139-year history that an incumbent government peacefully surrendered power to the opposition.

The victory of Copei's Caldera after 11 years of Democratic Action (AD) rule proved that Venezuela was indeed a two-party state. During the Betancourt presidency, AD had produced a radical offshoot led by Domingo Alberto Rangel, but as it was banned it could not participate in the 1963 elections. AD had a core of leaders and still another offshoot was led by one of these, but they suffered a heavy defeat in the same elections. The rural clientelist system was definitely working. But during 1968, according to the "Buggins's turn" rule that the party applied, a referendum was held in which the two rival adecos were Luis Beltran Prieto Figueroa, a leading intellectual, and Gonzalo Barrios, a politician who was the leading light in the so-called "Parisian circle" within the party and whose turn it definitely wasn’t. As the vote was an internal party affair the true results are not really known. It is as likely that Prieto Figueroa won as that he didn’t, but the party hierarchy claimed that Barrios had and Barrios became the official candidate. Prieto Figueroa was incensed and he formed his own party whose secretary general was Jesus Angel Paz Galarraga. Caldera was anything if not obstinate and he had been the losing Social Christian COPEI candidate in the elections of 1947, 1958 and 1963. This time (1968) Caldera's perseverance paid off and he won against runner up Barrios by the slim margin of 30,000. In another Latin American country this would have provoked turbulence, as even in America Bush's electoral margin in 2000 did in a legal sense, but not in Venezuela. Caldera thus became president by the skin of his teeth. Prieto Figueroa came in third, but amazingly a party that had been formed by nostalgic Pérezjimenistas and had no organization whatever obtained around a quarter of the vote for Congress, and this was happening less than ten years since the dictator's overthrow.

Democracy functioned, but did not fulfil everybody's expectations. Pérez Jiménez himself won election to a seat in the Senate, but when he returned in the belief that Venezuela would respect the election result, the adecos had already had their complaisant judges issue orders of arrest on one pretext or another and at the airport Pérez Jiménez was mobbed by adeco thugs. He fled Venezuela looking very scared, never to return from his Madrid mansion. This was a clear demonstration that elections in Venezuela had to be won by the right people or else. And not only that: the democratic Venezuelan government wasn’t even respectful of Venezuelan civil liberties as was shown when Caldera had a highly disrespectful magazine with a respectable circulation, called Reventon, shut down by the military with the unlikely charge that it had insulted the armed forces by saying that some soldiers were gay (statistically inevitable) . In his political past, Caldera had been pro-business, but in his incarnation as president he increased government intervention in the economy. He was hamstrung by Congress, which was controlled by the adecos, so bureaucracy was kept at the same level it had been, but the new government applied unabashedly the "to the victors belong the spoils" practice. The leftist parties, of which now there were many more than in 1958, were legalized. Towards the end of his government, oil prices increased sensationally but fiscal revenues came into the state's coffers too late for Caldera to use them to shape up his party's muscles. There was also an eye-popping building boom in Caracas but suspiciously the new constructions were going up but not into the market.

Presidency 

Caldera's first government emphasized the end of the Betancourt doctrine, which denied Venezuelan diplomatic recognition to any regime, right or left, that came to power by military force. Caldera broke the isolation of Venezuela with the rest of Latin America, recognizing the military governments of the region, and made a policy in defense of the insular territories and the Gulf of Venezuela and signed the Port of Spain Protocol with Guyana, which concerned the Guayana Esequiba. The president's economic policies were notable for the reinforcement of the power of the employer's association Fedecámaras and the period of North American economic crisis that also characterized the first term of Richard Nixon with low oil prices, which caused the economic growth of Venezuela to stagnate. Caldera also presided over a period of pacification of the country, making a ceasefire with the left armed groups, which were then integrated into the political life, and legalizing the Communist Party of Venezuela in spite of the opposition of Acción Democrática.

Caldera also reformed the 1961 Constitution to remove a ban on election to public office for people who had been sentenced to more than three years in prison, which had been specifically designed to politically disqualify General Marcos Pérez Jiménez by means of its retroactive application. Caldera closed the Industrial Technical School permanently and the Central University of Venezuela for two years due to student protests against his government. On December 9, 1970, Rafael Caldera created the Great Marshal of Ayacucho Institute of National Higher Defence Studies (IAEDEN) to further the development of a state security perspective and to contribute to the defense culture of the nation.

Caldera, who raised the tax on the rent to the oil companies to 60 percent, initiated the construction of El Tablazo petrochemical complex in Zulia. Led by finance minister Luis Enrique Oberto, Caldera's government began the process of nationalizing Venezuela's oil industry. He also inaugurated the Poliedro de Caracas and the Miguel Pérez Carreño Hospital in Caracas and concluded the demarcation of borders with Brazil. Rafael Caldera ended his first term as president on March 12, 1974, and was replaced by Carlos Andrés Pérez, from Acción Democrática, who won the 1973 elections.

Pacification of Venezuela 
In 1969, the new government inherited a country with active urban and rural guerrilla movements, bans on two important political parties, and many political leaders imprisoned. From the beginning of Caldera's presidency, this practice was suspended and constitutional guarantees thereafter were maintained.

The government arrived with an attitude of ideological pluralism and dialogue across the political spectrum, entered into talks with the armed groups, legalized leftist parties, and released jailed politicians, demanding only that they stay within Venezuelan law.

As a result of this effort, by the end of Caldera's presidency, for the first time in many years, no significant political organization in Venezuela planned to take control of the government by violent means. At the 1973 elections, leaders of the old guerrilla movements were elected as senators and deputies.

Cabinet

References

See also 
 History of Venezuela, 1958 - 1998
Rafael Caldera
Second Presidency of Rafael Caldera
Presidents of Venezuela

History of Venezuela
Rafael Caldera
Caldera, Rafael